The seventeenth series of the British semi-reality television programme The Only Way Is Essex was confirmed on 3 June 2015 when it was announced that it had renewed for at least a further six series, taking it up to 21 series. It is the second series to be included in its current contract. The series will launch on 28 February 2016. Ahead of the series it was announced that cast member Jess Wright had quit the show having appeared since the first series in 2010. Ferne McCann also confirmed that she would be taking a break from the show but would be back. It will be the first series to include new cast members Chloe Meadows, Courtney Green, and Chris and Jon Clark. Jon previously appeared on ITV2's Love Island.

This series also featured the show's 200th episode. On 9 March 2016, it was announced that former Ex on the Beach star and Celebrity Big Brother housemate Megan McKenna has joined the cast and would be making her debut during the 200th episode. However, Megan previously made a brief appearance on the first Essexmas special in 2010 where she originally auditioned for Jess Wright's new girl group. On 13 March 2016, ahead of the show's milestone 200th episode, a special episode titled "The Power of TOWIE" aired hosted by Mark Wright, where cast past and present united to discuss the show's history.

Cast

Episodes

{| class="wikitable plainrowheaders" style="width:100%; background:#fff;"
! style="background:#F5A9D0;"| Seriesno.
! style="background:#F5A9D0;"| Episodeno.
! style="background:#F5A9D0;"| Title
! style="background:#F5A9D0;"| Original air date
! style="background:#F5A9D0;"| Duration
! style="background:#F5A9D0;"| UK viewers

|}

Reception

Ratings

References

The Only Way Is Essex
2016 British television seasons
2016 in British television